Psammphiletria delicata is a species of loach catfish endemic to Pool Malebo.  It grows to a length of 2.0 cm.

References 

 

Amphiliidae
Fish described in 2003
Taxa named by Tyson R. Roberts
Endemic fauna of the Democratic Republic of the Congo